Pedro Araya Guerrero (born 15 June 1974) is a Chilean politician and lawyer who is member of the Senate of Chile.

References

External links
 BCN Profile
 

1974 births
Living people
20th-century Chilean lawyers
University of Antofagasta alumni
Christian Democratic Party (Chile) politicians
Independent Regionalist Party politicians
Senators of the LV Legislative Period of the National Congress of Chile
Senators of the LVI Legislative Period of the National Congress of Chile